The 2017 Sweden Hockey Games was played between 9–12 February 2017. The Czech Republic, Finland, Sweden and Russia played a round-robin for a total of three games per team and six games in total. Five of the matches were played in Gothenburg, Sweden, and one match in Saint Petersburg, Russia. The tournament was part of 2016–17 Euro Hockey Tour. Tournament was won by Russia.

All times are local.
Gothenburg – (Central European Time – UTC+1) St Petersburg – (Moscow Time - UTC+3)

References

External links
Sweden Hockey Games

Sweden Hockey Games
Sweden
Sweden
Sweden
Sweden
Sweden
International sports competitions in Gothenburg
2010s in Gothenburg
Sweden Hockey Games
Sports competitions in Saint Petersburg